Vitaliy Trukshin is a Soviet sprint canoeist who competed during the 1970s. He won four medals at the ICF Canoe Sprint World Championships with a gold (K-1 4 x 500 m: 1973), two silvers (K-1 500 m: 1973, K-1 4 x 500 m: 1974), and a bronze (K-1 1000 m: 1978).

References

Living people
Soviet male canoeists
Year of birth missing (living people)
Russian male canoeists
ICF Canoe Sprint World Championships medalists in kayak